The People's Republic of Tyre was a short-lived, PLO controlled, state-within-a-state during the Lebanese Civil War. It was formed in early 1976 after the full takeover of the city of Tyre in the south of Lebanon by the Palestine Liberation Organization and the Lebanese Arab Army.

Background 
In February 1975, Tyre saw pro-PLO and anti-government demonstrations after Arab Nationalist MP and PNO leader, Maarouf Saad, had been killed in Sidon, allegedly by the army. Then, in early March 1975, a PLO commando of eight militants sailed from the coast of Tyre to Tel Aviv to mount the Savoy Hotel attack, during which eight civilian Hostages and three Israeli soldiers were killed as well as seven of the attackers. Five months later - on 5 August 1975 - Israel attacked Tyre "from land, sea and air". More assaults followed on 16 and 29 August, as well as on 3 September.

PLO and LAA takeover of Tyre 
In 1976, local commanders of the PLO took over the municipal government of Tyre with support from their allies of the Lebanese Arab Army (LAA). They occupied the army barracks, set up roadblocks and started collecting customs at the port. Parts of Kazem al-Khalil's estate were confiscated as well. Most of the funding, according to Robert Fisk, came from Iraq though, while arms and ammunition were provided by Libya.

The new rulers thus declared the founding of the "People's Republic of Tyre". However, they quickly lost support from the Lebanese-Tyrian population because of their "arbitrary and often brutal behavior". Even Tyre's veteran politician Jafar Sharafeddin, whose family promoted freedom for the Palestinians over generations, was quoted criticising the PLO for "its violations and sabotage of the Palestinian cause".

References 

History of Tyre, Lebanon
Palestine Liberation Organization
Deep states of the Lebanese Civil War